The following is a list of notable Alabama A&M University people, including alumni, notable faculty members and administrators, and others affiliated with the University.

Education

Public service and government

Athletics

Maurice Kemp (born 1991), basketball player in the Israeli Basketball Premier League

Civil rights

Religion

Art and media

Other

Notable faculty, staff and coaches
 William Hooper Councill - Former slave and the first president of Huntsville Normal School, which is today Alabama Agricultural and Mechanical University.
 Harriet Josephine Terry - One of the founders of Alpha Kappa Alpha. Taught English at Alabama A&M for 37 years.
 Constance Jordan Wilson - urban planner, on faculty of AAMU from 1979 to 2019
 Ben Jobe - Former Alabama A&M Bulldogs basketball head coach from 1982 to 1986.
 Ray Greene - Former head football coach, 1979-1983, 1986-1988. 
 Ron Cooper - Former head football coach, 1998-2001. 
 Anthony Jones - Former head football coach, 2002-2013. Second winningest football coach in program history.

References 

Alabama A&M University people